Prestoy Point (‘Nos Prestoy’ \'nos pre-'stoy\) is the sharp point projecting 800 m into the head of Barilari Bay on Graham Coast in Graham Land, Antarctica, formed by an offshoot of Mount Genecand.  The point is named after the settlement of Prestoy in Northern Bulgaria.

Location
British mapping in 1976.

Maps
 Antarctic Digital Database (ADD). Scale 1:250000 topographic map of Antarctica. Scientific Committee on Antarctic Research (SCAR), 1993–2016.
British Antarctic Territory. Scale 1:200000 topographic map. DOS 610 Series, Sheet W 66 64. Directorate of Overseas Surveys, Tolworth, UK, 1976.

References
 Bulgarian Antarctic Gazetteer. Antarctic Place-names Commission. (details in Bulgarian, basic data in English)
 Prestoy Point. SCAR Composite Antarctic Gazetteer

External links
 Prestoy Point. Copernix satellite image

Headlands of Graham Land
Bulgaria and the Antarctic
Graham Coast